The Thanetian is, in the ICS Geologic timescale, the latest age or uppermost stratigraphic stage of the Paleocene Epoch or Series. The Thanetian is preceded by the Selandian Age and followed by the Ypresian Age (part of the Eocene). The Thanetian is sometimes referred to as the Late Paleocene.

Stratigraphic definition
The Thanetian was established by Swiss geologist Eugène Renevier in 1873. The Thanetian is named after the Thanet Formation, the oldest Cenozoic deposit of the London Basin, which was first identified in the area of Kent (southern England) known as the Isle of Thanet.

The base of the Thanetian Stage is laid at the base of magnetic chronozone C26n. The references profile (Global Boundary Stratotype Section and Point) is in the Zumaia section (43° 18'N, 2° 16'W) at the beach of Itzurun, Pais Vasco, northern Spain. Fossils of the unicellular planktonic marine coccolithophore Areoligeria gippingensis make their first appearance at the base of the Thanetian, and help define its lowest stratigraphic boundary.

The top of the Thanetian Stage (the base of the Ypresian) is defined at a strong negative anomaly in δ13C values at the global thermal maximum at the Paleocene-Eocene boundary.

The Thanetian Stage is coeval the lower Neustrian European land mammal age (it spans the Mammal Paleogene zone 6 and part of zones 1 through 5.), the upper Tiffanian and Clarkforkian North American land mammal ages, the Riochican and part of the Itaboraian South American land mammal ages and the upper Nongshanian and Gashatan Asian land mammal ages. The Thanetian is contemporary with the middle Wangerripian regional stage of Australia and the upper Ynezian regional stage of California. It overlaps the obsolete regional stages Landenian and Heersian of Belgium.

Palaeontology
The Sézanne flora is a fossil assemblage preserved in freshwater limestone deposits at Sézanne, laid down during the Thanetian Age, when Europe enjoyed a tropical climate. In the lagerstätte, leaves, entire flowers and seeds are minutely preserved. Also, the first representatives of Proboscidea appeared, Eritherium.

Climate
This period was characterized by temperatures warmer than those of today.

See also
 Paleocene–Eocene Thermal Maximum

References

Literature

; 2007: Closing the Mid-Palaeocene gap: Toward a complete astronomically tuned Palaeocene Epoch and Selandian and Thanetian GSSPs at Zumaia (Basque Basin, W. Pyrenees), Earth and Planetary Science Letters 262: pp 450–467.
; 2004: A Geologic Time Scale 2004, Cambridge University Press.
; 1873: Tableau des terrains sédimentaires formés pendant les époques de la phase organique du globe terrestre, Bulletin de la Société Vaudoise des Sciences Naturelles (Lausanne) 12: pp 218–252.

External links
GeoWhen Database - Thanetian
Paleogene timescale, at the website of the subcommission for stratigraphic information of the ICS
Stratigraphic chart of the Paleogene, at the website of Norges Network of offshore records of geology and stratigraphy

 
Paleocene geochronology
 
Geological ages